Streptomyces hypolithicus is a filamentous bacterium species from the genus of Streptomyces which has been isolated from soil from Miers Valley in the McMurdo Dry Valleys in Eastern Antarctica.

See also 
 List of Streptomyces species

References

Further reading

External links
Type strain of Streptomyces hypolithicus at BacDive -  the Bacterial Diversity Metadatabase

hypolithicus
Bacteria described in 2009